Pirolazamide (SC-26,438) is an antiarrhythmic agent that was never marked.

References 

Antiarrhythmic agents
Propionamides
Pyrrolopyrazines